Upper Curtis Glacier is in North Cascades National Park in the U.S. state of Washington, on the west slopes of Mount Shuksan. Upper Curtis Glacier is not connected to Lower Curtis Glacier downslope to the southwest, but is to Hanging Glacier to the north and to Sulphide Glacier to the east.

See also
List of glaciers in the United States

References

Glaciers of the North Cascades
Glaciers of Whatcom County, Washington
Glaciers of Washington (state)